Denise Harper Angel (born November 24, 1953) is an American politician who has served in the Kentucky Senate from the 35th district since 2005. Prior to being elected, she worked in various positions of public service, including roles on other campaigns. She was also a delegate to the Democratic National Convention in 1992.

References

1953 births
Living people
Democratic Party Kentucky state senators
21st-century American politicians